Caitlín Brugha (11 December 1879 – 1 December 1959) was an Irish Sinn Féin politician who served as a Teachta Dála (TD) for the Waterford constituency from 1923 to 1927.

Early life
Kingston was born in Birr, County Offaly to William Kingston, a shopkeeper, and Catherine (née Roche). She attended the Convent of the Sacred Heart in Roscrea. Her family later moved to Dublin when she was 31 and she continued the activism she had been part of through the Gaelic League when she got there. 

She married Irish revolutionary Cathal Brugha, head of a candle manufacture company, in 1912. Because of the family activities and involvement in the War of Independence, they moved several times, to the Ring Gaeltacht in Waterford and Ballybunion in Kerry. In the aftermath of the Truce the family was able to return to Dublin.

Politics
Cathal Brugha died in battle on 7 July 1922 in the first days of the Irish Civil War, having taken the Republican side opposing the Anglo-Irish Treaty. His death left her widowed with six children under the age of 10. She ran in the same constituency that her husband represented and was elected to Dáil Éireann as a Sinn Féin TD at the 1923 general election for the Waterford constituency. In accordance with Sinn Féin policy of the time she did not take her seat in Dáil Éireann. She stayed with the abstentionists of Sinn Féin when Éamon de Valera left to found Fianna Fáil in 1926. 

She was re-elected at the June 1927 general election. Sinn Féin was unable to raise the funds to contest the second election called that year, and Brugha did not contest the September 1927 general election. Brugha successfully campaigned on the welfare of Republican prisoners.

Later life
She established a drapery business, Kingston's Ltd, in 1924 and following her exit from politics devoted much time to the venture.

Her continuing anti-Britishness was evidenced when, in 1941, she was accused of harbouring German spy Günther Schütz, who had parachuted into Wexford.

Her son, Ruairí Brugha, became a Fianna Fáil politician and was elected to Dáil Éireann at the 1973 general election.

See also
Families in the Oireachtas

References

1879 births
1959 deaths
Caitlin
Early Sinn Féin TDs
Members of the 4th Dáil
Members of the 5th Dáil
Politicians from County Offaly
Spouses of Irish politicians
20th-century women Teachtaí Dála